Ezio Coppa (24 February 1898 - 26 July 1969) was an Italian politician.

Coppa was born in Ponza, Lazio. He represented the Common Man's Front in the Constituent Assembly of Italy from 1946 and 1948 and the Monarchist National Party in the Chamber of Deputies from 1948 to 1953.

References

1898 births
1969 deaths
People from the Province of Latina
Common Man's Front politicians
National Union (Italy, 1947) politicians
Monarchist National Party politicians
20th-century Italian politicians
Members of the Constituent Assembly of Italy
Members of the Chamber of Deputies (Italy)
Politicians of Lazio